Serpell is a surname. Notable people with the surname include:

Christopher Serpell (1910–1991), English journalist
David Serpell (1911–2008), British civil servant who wrote the Serpell Report
Grant Serpell (born 1944), English musician
James Serpell (born 1952), American zoologist
Namwali Serpell (born 1980), Zambian writer
Robert Serpell (born 1944), British psychologist

See also
Serpell Report